General elections were held in Pakistan on 6 October 1993 to elect the members of National Assembly. The elections took place after both the Prime Minister Nawaz Sharif and President Ghulam Ishaq Khan resigned to resolve a power struggle.

Prior to the elections, the ruling Islami Jamhoori Ittehad alliance was dissolved due to clashes between its member parties. The alliance's place in the two-party system (alongside the Pakistan Peoples Party) was taken up by Sharif's Pakistan Muslim League (N).

The elections were held under the caretaker government of Moeenuddin Ahmad Qureshi. Although the PML (N) received the most votes, the PPP won the most seats. After winning the support of minor parties and independents, Benazir Bhutto became Prime Minister for a second non-consecutive term. Voter turnout was 40%.

Background
The Pakistan Muslim League (N) (PML-N) won the 1990 election and the party's leader, Nawaz Sharif, became Prime Minister. In early 1993 he attempted to strip the President of the power to dismiss the Prime Minister, National Assembly and regional assemblies. However, in April 1993 President Khan dismissed Sharif for corruption and called elections for 14 July after dissolving the National Assembly. Sharif immediately appealed to the Supreme Court, which in May ruled by 10 to 1 that Khan had exceeded his powers and therefore restored Sharif as Prime Minister.

Khan and Sharif then began to battle for control of Pakistan for the next two months. They both attempted to secure control over the regional assemblies and in particular, Punjab. In Punjab this saw a staged kidnapping and the moving of 130 members of the Punjab Assembly to the capital to ensure they stayed loyal to Sharif. Meanwhile, the leader of the main opposition party Benazir Bhutto threatened to lead a march on Islamabad unless new elections were called.

Finally on 18 July, under pressure from the army to resolve the power struggle, Sharif and Khan resigned as Prime Minister and President respectively. Elections for the National Assembly were called for 6 October with elections for the regional assemblies set to follow shortly afterwards.

Campaign
Until the election the chairman of the Senate, Wasim Sajjad became interim president and former World Bank executive Moeenuddin Ahmad Qureshi became caretaker prime minister. The interim government cut spending, introduced a tax on rich landowners and cracked down on corruption and drug traffickers. They were praised for stabilising the country while the campaign took place but their policies were criticised by the two main political leaders, Sharif and Bhutto.

In total 1,485 candidates stood in the election but the main fight was between the PML-N of Nawaz Sharif and the PPP of Benazir Bhutto. Their policies were very similar but saw a clash of personalities with both parties making many promises but not explaining how they were going to pay for them. Sharif stood on his record of privatisations and development projects and pledged to restore his taxi giveaway program. Bhutto promised price supports for agriculture, pledged a partnership between government and business and campaigned strongly for the female vote.

Opinion polls showed a very close election between the two main parties but there was a lot of cynicism among voters. The army was credited with making sure that the election was fair and deployed 150,000 troops in polling stations to ensure this.

Results
The PPP won the most seats in the election at 86 but failed to gain a majority with the PML-N second with 73 seats. This was also the first election in Pakistan in which the party that won the popular vote, the PML-N, failed to win the most seats. The PPP performed strongly in Bhutto's native Sindh and rural Punjab, while the PML-N was strongest in industrial Punjab and the largest cities such as Karachi, Lahore and Rawalpindi. Islamic fundamentalist candidates did poorly in an election that was marked by a low turnout. Turnout in Pakistan's largest city, Karachi, was particularly low at 20% after one party MQM (A) boycotted the election. International observers from 40 countries reported no serious irregularities in an election which was seen as the most free and fair since 1970. One seat was not contested on election day due to the death of a candidate; it was subsequently won in a by-election by the People's Democratic Alliance.

Aftermath

Election for Prime Minister
The election for Prime Minister took place on 19 October 1993. Both main parties lobbied the smaller parties and independents for their support in the National Assembly; the PPP was successful and Benazir Bhutto was elected Prime Minister receiving 121 votes to 72 for Nawaz Sharif. Her position was strengthened by a strong performance by the PPP in the regional elections on 9 October, in which the PPP, with the help of its Alliance partners, managed to retake Punjab for the first time since 1971.

References

General elections in Pakistan
general
Pakistan
Pakistan
Election and referendum articles with incomplete results